The 2015–16 DePaul Blue Demons men's basketball team represented DePaul University during the 2015–16 NCAA Division I men's basketball season. They played their home games at the Allstate Arena, and were members of the Big East Conference. Dave Leitao returned to Chicago to lead the Blue Demons for the second time, following a three-year tenure from 2002–2005. They finished the season 9–22, 3–15 in Big East play to finish in ninth place. They lost to Georgetown in the first round of the Big East tournament.

Previous season 
The Blue Demons finished the 2014–15 season with record of 12–20 (6–12 Big East), tied for 7th in the conference. They were eliminated in the opening round of the 2015 Big East tournament. Following the season, head coach Oliver Purnell resigned and was replaced by Leitao.

Departures

Incoming recruits

Roster

Schedule

|-
!colspan=9 style=| Exhibition

|-
!colspan=9 style=| Non-Conference regular season

|-
!colspan=9 style=| Big East Conference regular season

|-
!colspan=9 style=| Big East tournament

References

DePaul Blue Demons men's basketball seasons
DePaul